Thyas miniacea is a species of moth of the family Noctuidae. It is found from the Moluccas and Lesser Sundas to northern Australia, Fiji, Samoa, New Caledonia and Micronesia (Marianas, Carolines).

The larvae feed on Quisqualis and Terminalia species.

Gallery

External links
 Australian Caterpillars

Ophiusina